Season Ma is a Chinese actress and assistant director from Hong Kong. Ma was the 1983 winner of Best New Performer.

Career 
In 1982, Ma started her acting career. Ma is known for her role as Cam Nuong, a 14-year-old girl, in Boat People, a 1982 drama film about Vietnamese refugees that is directed by Ann Hui. Ma won the Hong Kong Film Award for Best New Performer. Ma appeared as Bonnie Leung in The Owl vs Bombo, a 1984 action comedy film directed by Sammo Hung. In 1985, Ma debuted as an assistant director with director Stanley Kwan in Women, a drama film. This film was also a directorial debut for Stanley Kwan, who was nominated for Best Director at the 5th Hong Kong Film Awards, but did not win. In 1987, Ma was a Hong Kong Film Award for Best Actress Nominee in Silent Love, a 1986 film for her role as Heung Gite. Ma's last film as assistant director was Full Moon in New York, a 1989 drama film directed by Stanley Kwan. By 1989, Ma was credited with 4 films as assistant director and over 10 films as an actress.

Filmography

Films 
 1982 Boat People – Cam Nuong.
 1982 Coolie Killer
 1983 Last Affair – Mei-Lan
 1984 Double Trouble – Ma's daughter
 1984 The Owl and Bombo (aka The Owl vs Bombo) – Bonnie Leung 
 1985 Twinkle Twinkle Lucky Stars – Tour girl in Thailand 
 1985 Women – Assistant director
 1986 Silent Love – Heung Gite / Heung Siu Kwai.
 1986 Armour of God – Assistant director
 1986 The Lunatics – Teacher
 1987 Mr. Handsome – Assistant director 
 1988 Double Fattiness – Assistant director 
 1988 In the Line of Duty III – Waitress who delivers flower
 1988 Let's Rage the Gangland 
 1989 The First Time Is the Last Time – Ma Yuk-fung, Inmate 7144 
 1989 A Fishy Story – Communist demonstrator
 1989 Full Moon in New York – Assistant director

Awards 
 1983 Hong Kong Film Award for Best New Performer in Boat people.
 1987 Hong Kong Film Award for Best Actress Nominee in Silent Love.

See also 
 2nd Hong Kong Film Awards
 6th Hong Kong Film Awards

References

External links 
 Season Ma at imdb.com
 Season Ma at hkcinemagic.com 
 Season Ma Si-San at hkmdb.com

Hong Kong film actresses
Living people
Year of birth missing (living people)